Rodney Scott Carrington (born October 19, 1968) is an American stand-up comedian, actor, country music artist and songwriter. He has released six major-label studio albums and a greatest hits package, on Mercury Records and Capitol Records. His comedy act typically combines stand-up comedy and original songs. Most of his songs are performed in a neotraditional country style, with Carrington handling lead vocals and guitar. Carrington has also starred in the ABC sitcom Rodney and in the 2008 film Beer for My Horses.

Early life
Rodney Carrington was born in Longview, Texas in 1968, and lived there until 1990. He worked as a comedian in local venues, gaining exposure through radio programs such as The Bob and Tom Show.

Career
Carrington's first album, Hangin' with Rodney, was released in 1998 via Mercury Records Nashville. This album, consisting of both stand-up comedy and original songs, contained the non-charting single "Letter to My Penis" and peaked at No. 73 on Top Country Albums.

He moved to Capitol Nashville for his next album, 2000's Morning Wood. It was his first Top 20 album on the US Country charts, first Gold-certified recording, and it brought him to the singles charts for the first time with "More of a Man", which reached No. 71 on Hot Country Singles & Tracks (now Hot Country Songs). After it came the live album Live: C'mon Laugh You Bastards, which did not chart. Carrington's third release for Capitol was 2003's Nut Sack. It mostly consisted of studio-recorded comedy songs and only featured five stand-up sketches. It included the single "Don't Look Now" which reached No. 60.

A Greatest Hits package followed in 2004. This album comprised selections from his Capitol recordings on two discs: stand-up routines on one disc, and songs on the other. It also included two previously unreleased songs: "Put Your Clothes Back On" and his first non-comedy song, "Things We Didn't Know." This compilation album reached No. 3 on the Billboard Top Comedy Albums chart and No. 11 on the Billboard Top Country albums chart, becoming Carrington's first Platinum-certified recording.

Also in 2004, Carrington made his acting debut in Rodney, a sitcom based largely on his own life which aired on ABC for two seasons. He released King of the Mountains in 2007. In addition to reaching No. 2 on the US Comedy Albums chart and No. 15 on the US Country chart, King of the Mountains reached No. 68 on the US Billboard 200 pop albums chart, the highest-ever peak position for any of his recordings. King of the Mountains contains his second serious song, "Angel Friend", a tribute to his best friend Barry Martin, who died suddenly in 2003.

In 2008 he appeared in the film Beer for My Horses, which also starred Toby Keith.

Carrington released his sixth studio album El Niño Loco in 2009. The album was his final release for Capitol Records. Unlike his previous releases, El Niño Loco does not feature any stand-up sketches. It also contains his third non-comedy song "Funny Man".

Later in 2009, Carrington released his first Christmas album, Make It Christmas. The first single from the album, a non-comedy tribute to soldiers stationed abroad called "Camouflage and Christmas Lights", became his first Top 40 country hit in December 2009.

Carrington has released two more comedy albums on the independent label Laughter's Good Records: Laughter's Good (2014) and Here Comes the Truth (2017). In between these two, he also released a compilation album of comedy songs, titled Rodney Carrington: The Hits (2015). He continues to tour as of 2022.

Personal life
Carrington lives in Oklahoma, where his 2004–2006 sitcom was set.

Concert Tour

Here Comes The Truth Tour (2016)

Discography

Studio albums

Compilation albums

Holiday albums

Live albums

Singles

Music videos

References

External links
 Official Website
 

1968 births
Living people
People from Longview, Texas
American comedy musicians
American country singer-songwriters
American stand-up comedians
American male television actors
Capitol Records artists
People from Tulsa, Oklahoma
Singer-songwriters from Texas
Singer-songwriters from Oklahoma
20th-century American comedians
21st-century American comedians
Country musicians from Texas
Country musicians from Oklahoma